Platte is the surname of the following people:
 Al Platte (1890–1976), American baseball player 
Ardeth Platte (born 1936), American Dominican Religious Sister and anti-nuclear activist
Felix Platte (born 1996), German football striker 
Ray Platte (1925–1963), American NASCAR driver 
Rudolf Platte (1904–1984), German actor